Carl Georg Siöblad (1683-1754), Swedish naval officer and Governor of Malmö
Erik Siöblad (1683–1700), Swedish Governor of Blekinge County